Michael Iorio (born April 20, 1964) is a retired American professional wrestler best known under the ring name of Big Guido. Iorio wrestled as an enforcer for The Full Blooded Italians in Extreme Championship Wrestling in the late 1990s. He was also a part of the team's reunion in World Wrestling Entertainment in 2005 and 2006. In addition, he has worked for Puerto Rico's International Wrestling Association and Empire State Wrestling.

Professional wrestling career

World Wrestling Federation
In 1991 and 1992, Iorio made a few appearances for the World Wrestling Federation as a jobber under the ring name Mike Fury. He lost to such stars as The British Bulldog, The Warlord, Tito Santana and Bret Hart.

Full Blooded Italians

Michael Iorio first joined the Full Blooded Italians in the original ECW at Heatwave 1996, introduced as Little Guido's "little" brother, Big Guido. He accompanied the stable members to the ring, and sporadically fought actual matches.

International Wrestling Association
In 2002, Iorio, under the ring name Primo Carnera won the International Wrestling Association's World Heavyweight Championship after the title was previously held up. He gave the title the same day to Savio Vega. In the following two months, he held the title two more times.

World Wrestling Entertainment
Iorio reappeared on World Wrestling Entertainment's ECW brand's One Night Stand on June 12, 2005 accompanying the Full Blooded Italians to the ring. Big Guido then reappeared on ECW on June 11, 2006 during ECW One Night Stand alongside Tony Mamaluke and Little Guido. On the June 13 edition of ECW, Big Guido took part in the hardcore battle royal and was eliminated by Big Show, but helped Sabu eliminate Big Show.

Championships and accomplishments
International Wrestling Association
IWA World Heavyweight Championship (3 times)
Eastern States Wrestling / Eastern Shores Wrestling
ESW Heavyweight Championship (1 time)
Empire State Wrestling
ESW Heavyweight Championship (3 times)
New Breed Wrestling
NBW Tag Team Championship (1 time) – with Tony DeVito

References

External links 
 

American male professional wrestlers
The Full Blooded Italians members
Living people
People from Brentwood, New York
1964 births